James Bradford "Brad" DeLong (born June 24, 1960) is an economic historian who is a professor of economics at the University of California, Berkeley. DeLong served as Deputy Assistant Secretary of the U.S. Department of the Treasury in the Clinton Administration under Lawrence Summers.

Education 
DeLong graduated from Harvard College in 1982, and also received an M.A. and a Ph.D. in economics also from Harvard. He then taught economics at universities in the Boston area, including MIT, Boston University, and Harvard University, from 1987 to 1993. He was a John M. Olin Fellow at the National Bureau of Economic Research in 1991–1992.

Career 
DeLong joined UC Berkeley as an associate professor in 1993. From April 1993 to May 1995, he served as Deputy Assistant Secretary for Economic Policy at the U.S. Department of the Treasury in Washington, D.C. As an official in the Treasury Department in the Clinton administration, he worked on the 1993 federal budget, the unsuccessful health care reform effort, and other policies, and on several trade issues, including the Uruguay Round of the General Agreement on Tariffs and Trade and the North American Free Trade Agreement. He became a full professor at Berkeley in 1997 and has been there ever since.

DeLong has been a research associate of the National Bureau of Economic Research (NBER), a visiting scholar at the Federal Reserve Bank of San Francisco, and an Alfred P. Sloan Research Fellow.

Along with Joseph Stiglitz and Aaron Edlin, DeLong is co-editor of The Economists' Voice, and has been co-editor of the Journal of Economic Perspectives. He is also the author of a textbook, Macroeconomics, the second edition of which he coauthored with Martha Olney. He co-edited (with Heather Boushey and Marshall Steinbaum) the book After Piketty: The Agenda for Economics and Inequality (2017), a volume of 22 essays about how to integrate inequality into economic thinking. He also contributes to Project Syndicate.

In 1990 and 1991, DeLong and Lawrence Summers co-wrote two theoretical papers that became critical theoretical underpinnings for the financial deregulation put in place when Summers was Secretary of the Treasury under Bill Clinton.

In 2019, DeLong said that he and other neoliberals had been "certainly wrong, 100 percent, on the politics" of economic policies. While he continued to believe that "good incremental policies" might be superior, he concluded that they were politically unattainable because of the lack of Republicans willing to work toward such goals. Instead, DeLong said, he favored "Medicare-for-all, funded by a carbon tax, with a whole bunch of Universal Basic Income rebates for the poor and public investment in green technologies." He concluded, "The world appears to be more like what lefties thought it was than what I thought it was for the last 10 or 15 years."

DeLong is an active blogger on political and economic issues and media criticism.

Personal life 
DeLong lives in Berkeley, California, with his wife, Ann Marie Marciarille, a professor of law (specializing in healthcare law) at the University of Missouri-Kansas City.

Publications
 Slouching Towards Utopia (2022 Basic Books -- 605 pp economic history from 1870 through 2010 detailing phenomenal growth in wealth and failure to achieve social justice.)
 "Noise Trader Risk in Financial Markets" (Journal of Political Economy, 1990; co-authored with Andrei Shleifer, Lawrence Summers, and Robert Waldmann)
 "Equipment Investment and Economic Growth" (Quarterly Journal of Economics, May 1991; co-authored with Lawrence Summers)
 "In Defense of Mexico's Rescue" (Foreign Affairs, 1996; co-authored with Christopher DeLong and Sherman Robinson)
 "Princes and Merchants: European City Growth before the Industrial Revolution" (Journal of Law and Economics 1993; co-authored with Andrei Shleifer)
 "The Marshall Plan: History's Most Successful Structural Adjustment Programme" (in R. Dornbusch et al., eds., Postwar Economic Reconstruction and Lessons for the East, Cambridge: M.I.T., 1993; co-authored with Barry Eichengreen) 
 "Between Meltdown and Moral Hazard: The International Monetary and Financial Policy of the Clinton Administration" (co-authored with Barry J. Eichengreen)
 "Review of Robert Skidelsky (2000), John Maynard Keynes, volume 3, Fighting for Britain" (Journal of Economic Literature, 2002)
 "The Triumph of Monetarism?" (Journal of Economic Perspectives, 2000)
 "Asset Returns and Economic Growth" (Brookings Papers on Economic Activity, 2005; co-authored with Dean Baker and Paul Krugman)
 "Productivity Growth in the 2000s" (NBER Macroeconomics Annual 2003)
 "The New Economy: Background, Questions, Speculations" (Economic Policies for the Information Age, 2002; co-authored with Lawrence Summers)
 "Speculative Microeconomics for Tomorrow's Economy" (First Monday, 2000; co-authored with Michael Froomkin)
 "America's Peacetime Inflation" (in Reducing Inflation, 1998)
 "Keynesianism Pennsylvania-Avenue Style" (Journal of Economic Perspectives, 1996)
 "Productivity and Machinery Investment: A Long-Run Look, 1870-1980" (Journal of Economic History, June 1992)
 "The Stock Market Bubble of 1929: Evidence from Closed-End Funds" (Journal of Economic History, September 1991; co-authored with Andrei Shleifer)

References

External links

 "Brad DeLong's Egregious Moderation"
 Journal of Economic Perspectives
 The Economists' Voice
 "The Order of the Shrill"
 
 DeLong Today - Web Series
 Brad DeLong's Grasping Reality
 

1960 births
Living people
Economists from California
New Keynesian economists
American male bloggers
American bloggers
Boston University faculty
Clinton administration personnel
Harvard Graduate School of Arts and Sciences alumni
Harvard University faculty
Writers from Boston
People from Contra Costa County, California
University of California, Berkeley College of Letters and Science faculty
20th-century American economists
21st-century American economists
21st-century American non-fiction writers
Economists from Massachusetts